The following lists events that happened during  1941 in New Zealand.

Population
 Estimated population as of 31 December: 1,631,200
 Increase since 31 December 1940: -2400 (-0.15%)
 Males per 100 females: 96.1
 The scheduled New Zealand census was not held due to World War II.

Incumbents

Regal and viceregal
Head of State - George VI
Governor-General - The Viscount Galway GCMG DSO OBE PC, succeeded same year by Marshal of the Royal Air Force Sir Cyril Newall GCB OM GCMG CBE AM

Government
The 26th New Zealand Parliament continued with the Labour Party in government. 1941 should have been an election year, but because of World War II the election was deferred until 1942.

Speaker of the House - Bill Barnard (Democratic Labour Party)
Prime Minister - Peter Fraser
Minister of Finance - Walter Nash
Minister of Foreign Affairs - Frank Langstone
Attorney-General - Rex Mason
Chief Justice — Sir Michael Myers

Parliamentary opposition 
 Leader of the Opposition -  Sidney Holland (National Party).

Main centre leaders
Mayor of Auckland - Ernest Davis then John Allum
Mayor of Hamilton - Harold Caro
Mayor of Wellington - Thomas Hislop
Mayor of Christchurch - Robert M. Macfarlane then Ernest Andrews
Mayor of Dunedin - Andrew Allen

Events 

 16 January: formation of the New Zealand Women's Auxiliary Air Force
 March: 2NZEF deployed to northern Greece and were soon involved in the Battle of Greece.
 24–30 April: New Zealand forces evacuated from mainland Greece to Crete.
 14 May: The minesweeper  was sunk by a mine while sweeping in the Hauraki Gulf, and sank with the death of five of her crew.
 20 May - 1 June: Battle of Crete - New Zealand forces suffer heavy losses: 671 dead, 967 wounded, 2,180 captured. On the first day of the German invasion, Charles Upham wins the V.C
 8 October: four police officers and three civilians are shot and killed at Kowhitirangi, near Hokitika, by Stanley Graham
 7 December: Hawaii bombed in a surprise attack by Japanese carrier forces on the US Navy.
 8 December: New Zealand declares war on Japan in response to Japanese attack on the United States.
 10 December: British battlecruiser  and battleship  sunk by Japanese torpedo planes, effectively taking Britain out of the sea war in the Pacific.
 15 December: A RNZAF Lockheed Hudson bomber returning to Nelson from a coastal patrol hit the top of a limestone bluff near Collingwood in thick fog, killing all four crew.  
 19 December: New Zealand suffers its worst naval loss when 150 New Zealanders on board  are killed after the ship strikes mines and sinks off the coast of Libya.
 German surface raiders operated in New Zealand waters in 1940 and 1941, sinking four ships.

Arts and literature

See 1941 in art, 1941 in literature

Music

See: 1941 in music

Radio

See: Public broadcasting in New Zealand

Film

See: :Category:1941 film awards, 1941 in film, List of New Zealand feature films, Cinema of New Zealand, :Category:1941 films

Sport
Most sporting events were on hold due to the war.

Chess
 The 50th National Chess Championship was held in Timaru, and was won by P. Allerhand of Wellington.

Horse racing

Harness racing
 New Zealand Trotting Cup – Josedale Grattan
 Auckland Trotting Cup – Uenuku

Lawn bowls
The national outdoor lawn bowls championships are held in Christchurch.
 Men's singles champion – C. Spearman (Christchurch RSA Bowling Club)
 Men's pair champions – H.S. Maslin, M.J. Squire (skip) (Hawera Bowling Club)
 Men's fours champions – C.H. Elsom, D.H. Joseph, A. Williamson, P. Munn (skip) (Canterbury Bowling Club)

Rugby union
:Category:Rugby union in New Zealand, :Category:All Blacks
 Ranfurly Shield

Rugby league
New Zealand national rugby league team

Soccer
 Chatham Cup competition not held
 Provincial league champions: 
	Auckland:	Comrade
	Canterbury:	Western
	Hawke's Bay:	Napier HSOB
	Nelson:	No competition
	Otago:	Mosgiel
	South Canterbury:	No competition
	Southland:	No competition
	Waikato:	No competition
	Wanganui:	No competition
	Wellington:	Seatoun

Births
 5 January: Bob Cunis, cricketer (died 2008).
 3 February: Gary Bartlett, cricketer.
 11 February: Alan "A. K." Grant, writer, humourist. (died 2000)
 12 February: Ross Morgan, cricketer.
 12 February: Bruno Lawrence, actor. (died 1995)
 26 February: Keith Thomson, cricketer.
 8 April: Roderick Deane, economist, public sector reformer, and businessman.
 7 May: Grahame Bilby, cricketer.
 17 June: Claire Stewart, politician. (died 2020)
 5 July: Lynley Dodd, children's author.
 20 July: Pita Sharples, academic and politician.
 17 August: Owen Marshall, writer (Owen Marshall Jones).
 12 September: Doug Kidd, politician.
 17 September: Tilly Hirst, netball player (died 2021).
 29 October: Bryan Yuile, cricketer.
 7 November: Jim Sutton, politician.
 12 November: Jenny McLeod, composer and musician.
 24 November: Bob Harvey, mayor of Waitakere City.
 Chin Wing Ho (Peter Chin), mayor of Dunedin.
 Gary Day, actor.
 Malcolm Douglas, politician.
 Allan Hawkey, cartoonist.
 (in England): Bernard Holman, artist. (died 1988)
 Ian Mune, actor and director.
 Ian Peters, politician.
:Category:1941 births

Deaths
 2 May: Sir James Parr, politician.
 26 May: William John Lyon, Labour MP, killed serving with 2NZEF on Crete.
 27 April:Elizabeth Taylor, community leader. 
 27 July: Alfred Henry O'Keeffe, painter.
 11 September: Albert Glover, politician.
 4 October: George Troup, architect.
 20 October: Stanley Graham, murderer (shot by police).
 1 November: Gordon Hultquist, Labour MP, killed serving with 2NZEF in North Africa.
 28 November: John Manchester Allen, National MP, killed serving with 2NZEF in Libya.
 29 November: Arthur Nattle Grigg, National MP, killed serving with 2NZEF in Libya.
 30 November: Thomas David Burnett, National MP.
 James Alexander Pond, analytical chemist and homoeopathic pharmacist.

See also
List of years in New Zealand
Timeline of New Zealand history
History of New Zealand
Military history of New Zealand
Timeline of the New Zealand environment
Timeline of New Zealand's links with Antarctica

References

External links

 
Years of the 20th century in New Zealand